Holton-Farkas is a product line of French horns and mouthpieces created through the joint venture of musical instrument manufacturer Frank Holton & Co. and legendary horn virtuoso Philip Farkas. The first model was released in 1958, and although no new models are being made (Farkas died in 1992), the series is still being manufactured today. These professional-grade horns and mouthpieces are regarded as some of the best in the market, and are the most popular for non-professional horn players.

History 
The production of the Holton-Farkas was an opportunity for Holton to overhaul its line of French horns with the help of a renowned horn player, Philip Farkas. Farkas and personnel from Holton worked closely together on all aspects of the line. In the business agreement, Farkas agreed to advise, test, and assist in the creation of the horns, and once created, to endorse and market them. In exchange, Holton agreed to furnish these horns for Farkas' personal use and pay him a percentage of the net selling price.

Conception 
The creation of the Holton-Farkas line was a product of chance. In early 1956, Farkas and two executives from Holton, Elliot Kehl and Theodore Kexel, were invited to dinner with Traugott Rohner, who published the magazine The Instrumentalist. Both parties were there for his own reasons: Farkas because he was writing an article, and Kehl and Kexel for discussions on advertising. The idea for a partnership came about over dinner conversation. Farkas recollects:

Despite the chance nature of this meeting, Farkas had already considered the idea of creating a horn earlier in his life. This being so, he promptly agreed to Holton's proposal.

1956–58
The foundational work on the Holton-Farkas line took place from 1956 until the first model (77) was released in 1958. 
The Holton-Farkas line was given much attention during this phase by both Farkas and Holton. Farkas, Arvid Walters (Holton's lead designer), and Elliot Kehl met several times a week to collaborate. Also, Holton produced entirely new tooling in order to consistently produce the quality of horn that Holton and Farkas sought after. 
The leaders of this project quickly formed a smooth working relationship. Of the work environment in this early stage, Nancy Fako, the author of a biography on Farkas and one of his former students, said,

Renold Schilke, another prominent musician and entrepreneur, also aided in the work on the new Holton-Farkas horns in August 1956.

Post-1958
Changes in personnel and the project itself took place after the release of the first model.

Farkas' physical presence at the Holton factory was largely replaced by correspondence through letter and phone. His job now was to promote the horns he helped create, though he frequently offered his help and advice. He was rarely seen without one of these horns and actively endorsed them.

In 1964, Frank Holton & Co. was bought by G. Leblanc Corp., a woodwind manufacturer, and in 2004, the two companies were bought by Steinway Musical Instruments, Conn-Selmer division. Despite some changes in management and staffing, Farkas' advice was still much sought after, and he continued to play and market the horns until his death in 1992.

Models 
Together, Holton and Farkas produced 18 different models of horns and 6 different mouthpieces. Many models are almost identical, with one or two key differences.

French horns 
Features common to the Holton-Farkas horn include a waterkey, .468" bore, .310 venturi mouthpipe, and 12 1/4" tapered bell. A table of the different models and their features follows.

French horn mouthpieces 
A table of the different Farkas H2850 French Horn mouthpiece models and their features follows.

References 

Brass instrument manufacturing companies
Musical instrument manufacturing companies of the United States